The Formula Regional Indian Championship is a FIA-certified Indian regional Formula 3 championship and is organized by Racing Promotions Pvt Ltd. The inaugural season will be held in 2022.

Car 
The championship features Tatuus-designed and built cars. The cars will be constructed out of carbon fibre and feature a monocoque chassis which feature a number of enhanced safety features including the new Halo device and improved side impact protection, and will have a six-speed paddle-shift sequential gearbox. The car will be powered by a Alfa Romeo 270PS (200kW) turbo engine tuned by Autotecnica.

Format 
The weekend's format is set to have three races per weekend with one single qualifying session. The fastest lap will award pole position for Race 1, while Race 3's grid will be set according to the 2nd fastest lap of every driver at the qualifying session. Race 2's grid will be a reverse grid from Race 1's results.

Circuits 
 Bold denotes a current Formula One Circuit.
 Italic denotes a former Formula One Circuit.

References 

FR India